HARNAM, The Folk Dance Ensemble "Harnam" (also The Representative Ensemble of The Łódź Voivodeship; in Polish: Zespół Tańca Ludowego "Harnam") – is the eldest folk ensemble in Poland. It was established in 1947 by Jadwiga Hryniewiecka. Harnam meets in the Ludwik Geyer’s White Factory in Łódź.

History 
Harnam was established by Szymon Harnam Textile Industrial Works No. 8 in Lodz. The first artistic director was Jadwiga Hryniewiecka and then her students: Sławomir Mazurkiewicz (1979-1990) and Maria Kryńska (1990-2008). In 1994 Maria Kryńska and Krzysztof Sitkowski founded a therapy studio for children and teenagers with Down syndrome and they worked until 2008. In 2012 Harnam and Krzysztof Sitkowski were awarded Silver Medal for Merit to Culture – Gloria Artis. Krzysztof Sitkowski (a Jadwiga Hryniewiecka’s student) has been artistic director from 2012.

Repertoire

The Folk Dance Ensemble "Harnam" 
Folk Dance Ensemble Harnam shows authentic character of Polish folk dance adapted to principles of theatre. Dances are with stage dramatization.

OFF Harnam Group 
Group OFF HARNAM has been working also since 2008. It combines folk motifs, legends and basic steps with modern dance. It is the first group which represents the style of Folk Jazz – a combination of Polish folk dance with Jazz dance.

Tournées 

 Algeria ('75, '85), 
 United Kingdom ('68, '79, '97), 
 Austria ('51, '62), 
 Belgium ('62, '66, '73, '84, '88, '94, '95), 
 China ('63, 2013), 
 Croatia ('92), 
 Czechoslovakia ('49, '84), 
 Czech Republic (2005), 
 Egypt ('88), 
 Finland (2007), 
 France ('75, '76, '77, '80, '83, '84, '85, '86, '91, '92, '94, '96, 2004, 2006), 
 Spain ('78, '94, '96, '98, 2008, 2009), 
 Netherlands ('83, '85), 
 Yugoslavia ('82, '95), 
 Canada ('69, '72), 
 North Korea ('86), 
 Luxembourg ('86), 
 Latvia (2007), 
 Morocco ('85, 2010), 
 Mongolia ('63), 
 Germany ('59, '78, '92, 2005, 2009), 
 East Germany ('50, '51, '52, '53, '61, '62, '65, '73, '75, '77, '79, '87, '89), 
 Portugal ('94), 
 Romania ('53, '69, 2008), 
 Syria ('87), 
 Switzerland ('64), 
 Sweden (2003), 
 Tunisia ('74), 
 Turkey ('98, 2000, 2002, 2003, 2005, 2012, 2014), 
 United States ('69, '72), 
 Hungary (2002, 2006), 
 Vietnam ('63), 
 Italy ('58, '61, '91), 
 Soviet Union ('64, '77) 
 Moldavian Soviet Socialist Republic ('74)

References

External links 
 http://www.harnam.pl/
 Facebook

Polish folk groups
Polish dances
Culture in Łódź
Musical groups established in 1947
Recipients of the Silver Medal for Merit to Culture – Gloria Artis
Recipients of the Order of the Banner of Work